Clayton George Bailey (March 9, 1939 – June 6, 2020), was an American artist who worked primarily in the mediums of ceramic and metal sculpture.

Early life and education
Clayton George Bailey was born on March 9, 1939, in Antigo, Wisconsin. In middle school he met his future wife, artist Betty Joan Graveen (later known as Betty G. Bailey).

Bailey attended the University of Wisconsin–Madison, where he received a B.S. degree in 1961, followed by an M.S. in Art and Art Education in 1962. In 1962, Bailey served as a technical assistant to Harvey Littleton, who was conducting glassblowing seminars at the Toledo Museum of Art.

Career 
Over the next five years, Bailey traveled the country accepting invitations to teach, from the People's Art Center in St. Louis, Missouri to positions with the University of Iowa, and the University of South Dakota. During this period Bailey received a Louis Comfort Tiffany grant (1963), and was appointed artist-in-residence at University of Wisconsin–Whitewater, where he taught ceramics for the following three years.

At the request of Robert Arneson, Bailey taught Arneson's classes at the University of California, Davis while Arneson was on sabbatical in 1967. In 1968, Bailey relocated to northern California, where he became a leading figure in the ceramic vein of the regional Funk art movement, pioneered by Arneson. Much of the Funk art activity was centered around UC Davis, where other prominent figures in the movement (Roy De Forest, Manuel Neri, William T. Wiley, David Gilhooly, Chris Unterseher, Margaret Dodd) either taught, or attended classes.

A leading venue for exhibiting Funk art was at the Candy Store Gallery, located in nearby Folsom, California, where Bailey would regularly present work in the context of both solo and group shows.

In 1968, Bailey began teaching at California State University, Hayward (now California State University, East Bay). He retired from this position in June 1996, with the title of Professor Emeritus of Ceramics.

Bailey became an ordained minister of the Universal Life Church in 1969, then formed The First Psychoceramic Church with headquarters in the Dairyville Cafe in Crockett, California. His church was created for the purpose of disseminating crackpot ideas (and performing the occasional marriage ceremony).

In 1970, Bailey established a home-studio space in rural Port Costa, California, where he became neighbors with fellow artist Roy De Forest. The two collaborated on numerous projects, and remained friends until De Forest's death in 2007.

Overlapping the Funk art movement was Nut art, a term coined by De Forest, which brought together many of the same practitioners including Arneson, De Forest, and Gilhooly, along with Peter Saul, Jerry Gooch, Victor Cicanski, Richard Shaw, David Zack. In 1972, Bailey co-curated the first-ever Nut art show at California State University, Hayward.

Stylistically, Bailey's work bridged several different categories and styles including Funk art, Nut art, ceramic and metallic sculpture, and Performance art. A recurring thread through all his work is humor, along with a high degree of craftsmanship.

Another track for artistic expression developed with the creation of Bailey's alter ego Dr. George Gladstone, beginning in 1969. Initially, the works blended performance and creations based on pseudo-science and personal mythologies. Works included the creation of fossilized remains (usually ceramic or from earth materials) and the classification of a new time period, the Pre-Credulous Era, the source of such Kaolithic curiosities as a cyclops skull and a Bigfoot skeleton. Dressed in a lab coat and pith helmet, Bailey as Dr. Gladstone performed excavations and staged performances and pranks. The World of Wonders, a traveling museum dedicated to Dr. Gladstone's life and work was developed, and presented in various venues, beginning with the Richmond Art Center. In 1976, the Wonders of the World Museum opened in downtown Port Costa, where it became a local tourist attraction until its closure in 1978. The collection is now split between Bailey's home-studio, and the Bailey Art Museum in downtown Crockett, California.

Over the years, the Dr. Gladstone character evolved into something more akin to a mad scientist, allowing Bailey to explore other forms of art with pseudo-scientific origins and associations. Most notable have been sculptures based on robots, beginning in the late 1970s and continuing on to today, although this work is now presented, and credited as Bailey's, not Dr. Gladstone's. The latest offshoot of the metallic sculpture (built from found materials and objects) had been a series of Space Guns.

In 1974, Bailey was profiled in Esquire Magazine as Dr. Gladstone. In the article written by Susan Subtle, "Their Arts Belong to Dada", Bailey was featured alongside artists Lowell Darling, Anna Banana, Ant Farm (group), Futzie Nutzle, Dr. Brute & Lady Brute, Mr. Peanut, Irene Dogmatic, AA Bronson, Captain Video, Flakey Rose Hip, Henry Humble, The Gluers and Dickens Bascom, Don and Rae Davis, and T.R. Uthco.

Bailey continued to work in a variety of mediums and styles until his death. Throughout his career as an artist, Bailey exhibited regularly throughout the United States, Europe, and Asia in both solo and group exhibitions. In 2011, Bailey was honored with a 50-year retrospective exhibition (Clayton Bailey's World of Wonders) at the Crocker Art Museum in Sacramento, California.

Bailey and his wife, fellow artist Betty G. Bailey, resided in Port Costa, California from 1970 until their deaths. Betty died on March 20, 2019. Bailey died at his Port Costa home on June 6, 2020. His health had deteriorated after a stroke in 2019.

Bailey Art Museum
In 2013, Bailey and his wife, artist Betty G. Bailey, founded the Bailey Art Museum in Crockett, California. The Bailey Art Museum is near the Bailey's former residence and studio in Port Costa. The  space brings together works from across the artist's five decades plus career featuring examples of Funk art, Nut art, ceramics, and metal sculpture (including robots and space guns), as well as pseudo-scientific curiosities by the artist's alter-ego Dr. Gladstone. The museum also includes narrative watercolor drawings by Betty G. Bailey and a gift shop.

In 2021, a large collection of Bailey's work was acquired by Curated Storefront in Akron, Ohio, through his daughter, Robin. Curated Storefront, an arts non-profit, has presented engaging artwork in multiple unused spaces; commissioned and employed artists; offered educational outreach programs to further engage the public; and stimulated commercial development. The work now resides in a pop-up museum in downtown Akron in the historic Akron landmark building. The pop-up museum features many of Bailey's most iconic pieces such as his trademark robots, Jumping Judy and the Bigfoot Bones. This pop-up museum is also the largest collection of Bailey's work in the world. The pop-up museum also features merchandise for sale and is open to the public for free.

Awards and honors
1963 – American Craft Council Grant
1963 – Louis Comfort Tiffany Foundation Grant
1979 – National Endowment for the Arts Grant Recipient
1982 – National Council on Education for the Ceramic Arts, Fellow of the Council
1984 – U.S. Patent #4440390 awarded for a "Novelty Cup for Forcibly Ejecting Liquid."
1990 – Panelist, California Arts Council, Artists Fellowship Program
1990 – National Endowment for the Arts Grant Recipient
1998 – Celestial Seasonings, Inc. "A Loose Interpretation III," Boulder, CO, Received Honorable Mention for creation of Celeste, the Robot Teabag
2009 – "Golden Bear Artist of the Year" Award and Commendation from the California Arts Council and the Lt. Governor of the State of California
2018 – National Council on Education for the Ceramic Arts, Honorary Member

Public collections
Selected Public Collections

Publications

References

External links

 
 "Bailey Art Museum - Crockett, CA." at Atlas Obscura.
 Beevers, Dale (October 14, 2012). "Clayton Bailey Artist Bio." at californiastudioglass.com.
 "Clayton Bailey's zany art in retrospective show." at SF Gate.
 https://web.archive.org/web/20140804001349/https://crockerartmuseum.org/exhibitions/exhibitions/past-exhibitions/624-clayton-baileys-world-of-wonders
 http://artdaily.com/index.asp?int_sec=11&int_new=51258&int_modo=2
 http://sacramentopress.com/2011/10/23/clayton-baileys-world-of-wonders-at-crocker/
 https://web.archive.org/web/20131026181538/http://blip.tv/weird-america/weird-america-the-robot-art-of-clayton-bailey-392360
 https://archive.today/20140327203056/http://www.hellocraft.com/2011/07/dudes-of-craft-clayton-bailey-the-mad-potter-of-port-costa/
 https://web.archive.org/web/20140407161234/http://www.thetech.org/exhibits/online/robotics/robotart/clayton.html
 http://www.conversations.org/story.php?sid=328
 https://web.archive.org/web/20140407161234/http://www.thetech.org/exhibits/online/robotics/robotart/clayton.html
 http://www.askart.com/askart/b/clayton_george_bailey/clayton_george_bailey.aspx
 http://www.artslant.com/global/artists/show/15049-clayton-bailey
 http://www.rawvision.com/articles/clayton-baileys-robotic-fantasies
 Clayton Bailey and Tony Natsoulas Conversation

1939 births
2020 deaths
People from Contra Costa County, California
People from Antigo, Wisconsin
University of Wisconsin–Madison alumni
University of Wisconsin–Whitewater faculty
California State University, East Bay faculty
Artists from California
Artists from Wisconsin
20th-century American ceramists
American conceptual artists
Nut artists
21st-century American ceramists
American ceramists
American potters
20th-century American sculptors
20th-century American male artists
21st-century American sculptors
21st-century American male artists
American male sculptors
Sculptors from California
Modern sculptors
Artists from the San Francisco Bay Area
Recycled art artists